The Richard Hapgood House is an historic multiunit house at 382-392 Harvard Street in Cambridge, Massachusetts.  The six-unit wood-frame building was built in 1889, and represents an unusual instance of Queen Anne styling applied to such a large structure.  It was built at a time when housing stock was transitioning from small types of multiunit housing (row houses and two- or four-family dwellings) to larger formats such as tenements and apartment houses.

The house was listed on the National Register of Historic Places in 1986.

See also
National Register of Historic Places listings in Cambridge, Massachusetts

References

Houses on the National Register of Historic Places in Cambridge, Massachusetts
Houses completed in 1889
Queen Anne architecture in Massachusetts